Trinity Village is a census-designated place (CDP) in Trinity County, California. Its population is 278 as of the 2020 census, down from 297 from the 2010 census.

Geography
According to the United States Census Bureau, the CDP covers an area of 4.0 square miles (10.4 km), all of it land.

Demographics
The 2010 United States Census reported that Trinity Village had a population of 297. The racial makeup of Trinity Village was 269 (90.6%) White, 1 (0.3%) African American, 18 (6.1%) Native American, 0 (0.0%) Asian, 0 (0.0%) Pacific Islander, 0 (0.0%) from other races, and 9 (3.0%) from two or more races. Hispanic or Latino of any race were 4 persons (1.3%).

The Census reported that 297 people (100% of the population) lived in households, 0 (0%) lived in non-institutionalized group quarters, and 0 (0%) were institutionalized.

There were 137 households, out of which 24 (17.5%) had children under the age of 18 living in them, 65 (47.4%) were opposite-sex married couples living together, 9 (6.6%) had a female householder with no husband present, 6 (4.4%) had a male householder with no wife present.  There were 10 (7.3%) unmarried opposite-sex partnerships, and 1 (0.7%) same-sex married couples or partnerships. 44 households (32.1%) were made up of individuals, and 16 (11.7%) had someone living alone who was 65 years of age or older. The average household size was 2.17.  There were 80 families (58.4% of all households); the average family size was 2.64.

The population was spread out, with 37 people (12.5%) under the age of 18, 14 people (4.7%) aged 18 to 24, 51 people (17.2%) aged 25 to 44, 126 people (42.4%) aged 45 to 64, and 69 people (23.2%) who were 65 years of age or older.  The median age was 54.0 years. For every 100 females, there were 109.2 males.  For every 100 females age 18 and over, there were 106.3 males.

The homeowner vacancy rate was 7.6%; the rental vacancy rate was 3.3%.  246 people (82.8% of the population) lived in owner-occupied housing units and 51 people (17.2%) lived in rental housing units.

Politics

References

Census-designated places in Trinity County, California
Census-designated places in California